A rating system can be any kind of rating applied to a certain application domain. They are often created using a rating scale.

Examples include:

Motion picture content rating system
Motion Picture Association film rating system
Canadian motion picture rating system
Television content rating system
Video game content rating system
DC Comics rating system
Marvel Rating System
Elo rating system
Glicko rating system
Chess rating system
Rating system of the Royal Navy
Star rating
Sports rating system
Wine rating
Texas Education Agency accountability ratings system